Walter John "Monk" Dubiel (February 12, 1918 – October 23, 1969) was an American professional baseball right-handed pitcher, who played in Major League Baseball (MLB) for the New York Yankees, Philadelphia Phillies, and Chicago Cubs.

His best season was his rookie 1944 campaign for the New York Yankees. While Dubiel evenly split 26 decisions, he logged 19 complete games, three shutouts, and 232 innings pitched, with an earned run average (ERA) of 3.38. After winning ten games, losing nine, for the  Yankees, he was sent to Minor League Baseball (MiLB) for the first two seasons immediately following World War II

On December 14, 1948, Dubiel was traded to the Chicago Cubs in a four-player swap that sent first baseman Eddie Waitkus to the Phils. Although Waitkus would miss much of the 1949 season after being shot by Ruth Ann Steinhagen (an obsessed fan), he would play a key role on the 1950 "Whiz Kids".

Dubiel pitched in 187 big league games, 97 as a starting pitcher, and allowed 854 hits, and 349 bases on balls, in 879 innings pitched. He posted a 45–53 won–lost record and a 3.87 career earned run average, struck out 289, and recorded 11 career saves during his MLB career.

Dubiel died in Hartford, aged 51, on October 23, 1969.

References

External links

1918 births
1969 deaths
Akron Yankees players
Baseball players from Hartford, Connecticut
Binghamton Triplets players
Chicago Cubs players
Erie Sailors players
Los Angeles Angels (minor league) players
Major League Baseball pitchers
Newark Bears (IL) players
New York Yankees players
Norfolk Tars players
Philadelphia Phillies players
Seattle Rainiers players
Springfield Cubs players
Toledo Sox players